Pablo Andújar tried to defend his 2008 title, but he was eliminated by Thiemo de Bakker in the semifinal.
de Bakker won in the final 6–4, 4–6, 6–2, against Thierry Ascione.

Seeds

Draw

Final four

Top half

Bottom half

References
 Main Draw
 Qualifying Draw

Singles